Klamath, also Klamath–Modoc and historically Lutuamian, is a Native American language spoken around Klamath Lake in what is now southern Oregon and northern California. It is the traditional language of the Klamath and Modoc peoples, each of whom spoke a dialect of the language. By 1998, only one native speaker remained, and by 2003, this last fluent Klamath speaker who was living in Chiloquin, Oregon, was 92 years old. As of 2006 there were no fluent native speakers of either the Klamath or Modoc dialects; however, as of 2019, revitalization efforts are underway with the goal of creating new speakers. 

Klamath is a member of the Plateau Penutian language family, which is in turn a branch of the proposed Penutian language family. Like other proposed Penutian languages, Plateau Penutian languages are rich in ablaut, much like Indo-European and Afro-Asiatic languages. Further evidence for this classification includes some consonant correspondences between Klamath and other alleged Penutian languages. For example, the Proto-Yokuts retroflexes  correspond to Klamath , and the Proto-Yokuts dentals  correspond to the Klamath alveolars .

Phonology

Vowels

Consonants

Sonorant triplets are voiced, voiceless, and "laryngealized" sounds.

Most consonants can be geminated. The fricative  is an exception, and there is evidence suggesting this is a consequence of a recent sound change. Albert Samuel Gatschet recorded geminated  in the late 19th century, but this sound was consistently recorded as degeminated  by M. A. R. Barker in the 1960s. Sometime after Gatschet recorded the language and before Barker did the same,  may have degeminated into .

Syntax
Klamath word order is conditioned by pragmatics. There is no clearly defined verb phrase or noun phrase. Alignment is nominative–accusative, with nominal case marking also distinguishing adjectives from nouns. Many verbs obligatorily classify an absolutive case.  There are directive and applicative constructions.

See also
List of extinct languages of North America

Notes

References
 Barker, M. A. R. (1963a).  Klamath Texts.  University of California Publications in Linguistics, volume 30. Berkeley/Los Angeles: University of California Press.
 ———. (1963b).  Klamath Dictionary.  University of California Publications in Linguistics 31. Berkeley/Los Angeles: University of California Press.
 ———. (1964).  Klamath Grammar.  University of California Publications in Linguistics 32. Berkeley/Los Angeles: University of California Press.
 Barker, Philip. (1959). The Klamath language. Dissertation, University of California, Berkeley
 Blevins, Juliette. (1993). Klamath Laryngeal Phonology. The University of Chicago Press
 Blevins, J. (2004, July). Klamath sibilant degemination: Implications of a recent sound change. IJAL, 70, 279–289.
 Chen, D. W. (1998, April 5). Blackboard: Lost languages; Kuskokwim not spoken here. New York Times.  

 Maudlin, W. S. (1998, April 17). Yale linguists part of effort to save dying languages. The Yale Herald. Retrieved May 6, 2008 
 Rude, Noel (1987).  Some Sahaptian-Klamath grammatical correspondences.  Kansas Working Papers in Linguistics, 12:67-83.
 Rude, Noel (1988). Semantic and pragmatic objects in Klamath. In In Honor of Mary Haas: From the Haas Festival Conference on Native American Linguistics, ed. by William Shipley, pp. 651–73.  Berlin: Mouton de Gruyter.
 Rude, Noel (1991).  Verbs to promotional suffixes in Sahaptian and Klamath.  In Approaches to Grammaticalization, ed. by Elizabeth C. Traugott and Bernd Heine.  Typological Studies in Language 19:185-199.  New York and Amsterdam: John Benjamins Publishing Company.

Online texts 
 Includes Klamath language plant names.

External links

 The Klamath Tribes Language Project
 Languages of Oregon: Klamath
 Klamath-Modoc language, native-languages.org
 Modoc language overview at the Survey of California and Other Indian Languages
 Klamath language, California Language Archive
 OLAC resources in and about the Klamath-Modoc language
 Klamath Bibliography

 
Klamath
Modoc tribe
Plateau Penutian languages
Indigenous languages of the North American Plateau
Indigenous languages of California
Indigenous languages of Oregon
Extinct languages of North America
Languages extinct in the 2000s
Language isolates of North America
2003 disestablishments in the United States